The government of Alfonso Rueda was formed on 16 May 2022, following the latter's election as President of Galicia by the Parliament of Galicia on 12 May and his swearing-in on 14 May, after the resignation of the former president Alberto Núñez Feijóo in April.

The cabinet comprises members of the PP and a number of independents.

Investiture

Council of Government
The Council of Government is structured into the office for the president, the two vice presidents and 11 ministries.

Notes

References

	

2022 establishments in Galicia (Spain)
Cabinets established in 2022
Cabinets of Galicia